These are a list of games that were cancelled from release on Sega's own video game consoles. The list include the Master System, Sega Genesis, Game Gear, Sega CD, Sega 32X, Sega Saturn, and the Sega Dreamcast. The list includes titles that may have been cancelled on Sega's hardware but still released on other platforms.

Master System

Sega Genesis

Game Gear

Sega CD

Sega 32X

Sega Saturn

Dreamcast

References

Sega video games

Cancelled
Sega